Skinamarink is a 2022 Canadian experimental supernatural horror film written and directed by Kyle Edward Ball in his feature directorial debut. The film follows two children who wake up during the night to discover that they cannot find their father, and that the windows, doors, and other objects in their house are disappearing.

Prior to the production of Skinamarink, Ball ran a YouTube channel where he would upload videos based on nightmares recounted by commenters. His 2020 short film Heck was developed as a proof of concept for Skinamarink. Skinamarink was shot on digital in Ball's childhood home in Edmonton, Canada. It premiered at the 26th Fantasia Film Festival in Montreal on July 25, 2022, and went on to screen at other film festivals, including some that offered at-home viewing options. Due to a technical issue, one of the festival platforms allowed a copy of the film to be leaked online; the film then garnered attention on social media apps and websites like TikTok, Reddit, and Twitter, where it attracted word-of-mouth acclaim.

Skinamarink received a theatrical release in the United States and Canada via IFC Midnight on January 13, 2023, and was released on the horror streaming service Shudder on February 2. The film was a box office success, grossing $2 million over a $15,000 budget. It received generally positive reviews from critics, who characterized it as drawing upon experiences of childhood fear, though it received a polarized response from audiences.

Plot
In 1995, four-year-old Kevin injures himself in what his six-year-old sister Kaylee says is a sleepwalking episode. Kevin is then taken to a hospital and brought back home. The father calls someone and tells them that the hospital didn't need to give stiches and he only hit his head. Some time later, the two siblings wake up in the middle of the night to find that their father has seemingly disappeared and that the windows, doors, and other objects in their house are gradually vanishing as well.

Kevin suggests they sleep downstairs, where they watch cartoons on a television. They awaken to find the house still dark. They hear an unexplained thumping noise and find a chair standing upside-down on the ceiling. Kevin asks Kaylee where she thinks their father is, to which she replies that she does not know. Kevin then suggests that "maybe he went with mom," to which Kaylee replies “I don’t want to talk about mom.”

Kevin shows Kaylee that the toilet in the downstairs bathroom has disappeared. Kaylee accompanies Kevin to the upstairs bathroom. She sees a doll on a bedroom ceiling, and Kevin returns to tell her that he is too frightened to use the toilet. They decide to place two buckets in the downstairs bathroom. A mysterious voice calls to Kaylee from the darkness, telling her to come upstairs.

Kaylee heads upstairs while Kevin remains downstairs. In a bedroom, she sees their father, who tells her to look under the bed. She does so but does not see anything. She then sees their mother sitting on the opposite side of the bed. Her mother tells Kaylee that they love her and Kevin, and instructs her to close her eyes before vanishing. She then looks at the pitch-black open closet and hears her mother say "There's someone here." From the closet she hears her mother calling out her name as well as moans of pain and breaking of bones.

Kaylee returns downstairs and Kevin asks her what happened, only for her to respond with asking Kevin to help move the couch. Kaylee and Kevin then push the couch to block off the hallway from which the voice was calling to her. Kevin falls asleep, and the voice calls to Kaylee again.

When Kevin wakes up, he calls out for her twice, but she does not reply. Lego bricks, VHS tapes, and other toys and objects are suspended against a wall. The voice calls to Kevin, beckoning him into the basement, where he sees Kaylee, who no longer has eyes or a mouth. After he returns upstairs, Kevin hears the mysterious voice calling to him again, telling him that it wants to play, as some of the toys in the house begin to disappear. A drawer opens in the kitchen, and Kevin complies with the voice's command that he insert a knife into one of his eyes.

Kevin picks up a telephone and calls 9-1-1. He whispers to the operator that he was cut with a knife and that he feels sick. The operator tells him to stay on the line, and that adults will be on their way to help. The operator then asks why he is whispering, if there is someone else in the room with him, and where he is in the house. Kevin says that he is downstairs and that the doors have disappeared, before dropping the phone.

The phone turns into a Chatter Telephone toy and the voice claims responsibility for it doing so, telling Kevin that it can "do anything." It says that Kaylee did not do as it told her; she said that she wanted her parents, so it took away her mouth. It tells Kevin to come upstairs, and he obeys. Holding a flashlight, he finds himself on the ceiling. He walks into a bedroom which becomes a void.

572 days later, a pile of toys sits in a seemingly endless hallway and is pulled back into the home. Kaylee is seen sitting on the side of a bed and her head slowly fades away, followed by the rest of her body. Photos of a faceless child are shown with photos of the child headless. Kevin cries out as blood splatters onto the floor, then disappears and spatters repeatedly, and Kaylee cries out for her mommy. Kevin asks if he can watch something happy. A door appears in the darkness, and later an indistinct face. The face tells Kevin to go to sleep; Kevin asks for its name and is met with silence.

Cast
 Lucas Paul as Kevin
 Dali Rose Tetreault as Kaylee
 Ross Paul as Kevin and Kaylee's father
 Jaime Hill as Kevin and Kaylee's mother

Production

Development
Ball previously ran a YouTube channel, Bitesized Nightmares, through which he would ask viewers to post comments about their nightmares and then shoot recreations of said nightmares. Skinamarink was inspired by the tropes recurrent in the most commonly submitted nightmares. The film was preceded by a 2020 proof of concept short film titled Heck, also directed by Ball.

Ball recalled, "I'd had a nightmare when I was little. I was in my parents' house, my parents were missing, and there was a monster. And lots of people have shared this exact same dream."

The inspiration for the film's title came after Ball heard the film's namesake song in the 1958 film Cat on a Hot Tin Roof and was reminded of Sharon, Lois & Bram's version, which he described as "an intrinsic part of [his] childhood". Ball was drawn to "Skinnamarink" as a film title because of its public-domain status, the evocativeness of the hard "k" sounds, and its personal relevance to him and many others; he slightly altered the spelling so that young children searching online for the song would not accidentally find his film.

Filming
Skinamarink had a budget of $15,000, which was mostly crowdfunded. It was shot digitally, with Jamie McRae serving as the film's cinematographer, in Ball's childhood home in Edmonton, Canada. Due to the limited budget, the film was made mostly using equipment borrowed from the local Film and Video Arts Society of Alberta (FAVA). Ball stated that, "Shooting a movie in the house you grew up in about two characters that are more or less you and your sister, I didn't have to try to make it more personal—it just sort of happened. And then an added benefit was my mom had saved a bunch of childhood toys that we used in the movie, so it got even more personal."

Ball cited the work of filmmakers Chantal Akerman, Stan Brakhage, Maya Deren, Stanley Kubrick, and David Lynch as influences on Skinamarink. He also stated that he was influenced by the 1967 avant-garde film Wavelength and the 1974 slasher film Black Christmas, saying of the latter: "Black Christmas has a lot of shots where there's just panning. I would refer to it when talking with my director of photography, who hadn't seen Black Christmas: 'This is my Black Christmas shot.

The cartoons seen on the television in Skinamarink are in the public domain, including Max Fleischer's 1936 Somewhere in Dreamland and The Cobweb Hotel  shorts, Ub Iwerks' 1935 Balloon Land, and the 1939 Merrie Melodies short Prest-O Change-O.

Skinamarink makes use of subtitles for certain lines of dialogue. Ball said, "The subtitles do originally appear in the script because I wanted to experiment with them. I've seen it quite a bit in analog horror on the internet. I thought it would be neat to play with scenes where we could hear people talking but it was so quiet we could only understand them with subtitles. And then when I got to editing there were certain scenes where, in retrospect, a scene is originally subtitled but the way they said something sounded good so we kept the audio. It was a fun little process."

Release

Festival screenings and leak
Skinamarink premiered at the 26th Fantasia International Film Festival in Montreal, Canada, on July 25, 2022. Skinamarink then screened at several other festivals, including some which offered at-home viewing options. Due to a technical issue, one of the festival platforms allowed the film's digital file to be pirated. This version was repeatedly uploaded to YouTube, and excerpts to TikTok, Reddit, and Twitter, where it attracted considerable word-of-mouth acclaim. A number of videos on TikTok deemed it one of the scariest films ever made, with one video asserting that it "is traumatizing everyone on TikTok". Ball expressed disappointment that the film was pirated, but was thankful for the positive reaction.

Theatrical release
The distribution rights for Skinamarink were acquired by AMC Networks for theatrical release via IFC Films (under the IFC Midnight label).

Skinamarink was theatrically released in the United States and Canada on January 13, 2023, opening on 629 screens. In the US, the film opened on partial schedules across the country, with showtimes added in accordance with demand and theatres' availability. Some theatre chains, such as Regal Cinemas and Cinemark Theatres, only screened the film nationwide on January 13 and 14. However, half of all theatres screening Skinamarink, including AMC Theatres locations, expanded their runs of the film to open engagements.

Skinamarink also screened in the United Kingdom, with showings taking place at the Prince Charles Cinema in London and Mockingbird Cinema in Birmingham.

The film was released on AMC Networks' horror streaming service Shudder on February 2, 2023.

Home media
In December 2022, Ball stated on Twitter that a Blu-ray release of the film is possible, while the possibility of a DVD release is uncertain.

Reception

Box office
Skinamarink grossed  over the first three days of its release, for a per-screen average of $1,100. By January 15, the film's gross had risen to $798,000, for a per-screen average of $1,150. By January 17, the film had grossed $890,000 domestically over the four-day Martin Luther King Jr. Day weekend. Against its $15,000 budget, the film is considered a commercial success.

Critical response
On the review aggregator website Rotten Tomatoes, the film has an approval rating of 71% based on 112 reviews, with an average rating of 6.3/10. The website's consensus reads, "Skinamarink can be more confounding than frightening, but for viewers able or willing to dial into its unique wavelength, this unsettling film will be difficult to shake." On Metacritic, the film has a weighted average score of 66 out of 100 based on 25 critic reviews, indicating "generally favorable reviews".

Owen Gleiberman of Variety wrote, "I found Skinamarink terrifying, but it's a film that asks for (and rewards) patience, and can therefore invite revolt [...] Yet if you go with it, you may feel that you've touched the uncanny." Michael Gingold from Rue Morgue praised the film's shot compositions and sound design, writing that it "takes you back to being a little kid lying in bed in the middle of the night, listening to strange noises coming from elsewhere in the house and wondering what their frightful sources might be." He added that the film often opts to neither show nor tell, "but it pays off to the point where that offscreen voice's simple request to 'Look under the bed' has you tingling with anticipation, and a simple sound effect can get you shivering." Dread Central's Josh Korngut awarded Skinamarink a score of three-and-a-half out of five stars, calling it "a deeply unsettling exploration of death, childhood, and the house you grew up in", and concluding: "For those seeking a traditional horror movie experience, turn back now. And I say so without judgment. [...] Filmmaker Kyle Edward Ball demands the audience pick up the shovel and do the digging on their own. It's not fair, but it is an exciting and original vision of what horror can look like." 

Matt Donato of /Film commended the film for its atmosphere, which he felt was derived from a familiarity with childhood experiences of fear, though he also criticized its runtime as overlong. He called it "exquisitely divisive — the kind of film that will balance zero and five-star reviews. That said, those seeking an abstract exploration of lights-out anxieties by lo-fi means should seek this shot-on-film-lookin' curiosity that abides by no conventional filmmaking rules." Matthew Jackson of The A.V. Club gave the film a grade of "A", writing that, "If you're willing to follow Ball and company down these dark corridors, into this twisted view of primal childhood fear and how easily we get lost in that fear, you're in for an absolutely unforgettable horror experience." Rolling Stones K. Austin Collins characterized Skinamarink as featuring a "quiet cadence of cutting, oddly mundane, wait-and-see terror," and concluded that the film is "quiet horror at its finest. Skinamarink isn't scary because of what it depicts. It's scary because it already knows that our imagination will do half of the work." 

Rachel Ho of Exclaim! compared the narrative structure of Skinamarink to that of a dream, and wrote that it elicits fear through "a familiar dread that paints the entire film" rather than a conventional storyline. She added that it "taps into our childhood nightmares, when the nonsensical made sense and the dark was a living, breathing organism to be feared", and wrote, "It's been awhile since I've been this scared while watching a movie, and it's not even because of jump scares or the boogeyman. It's the disarming and unsettling feeling Ball creates, and the anxiety that he builds that never quite dissipates." Richard Brody of The New Yorker called the film "accomplished but seemingly unfinished—indeed, hardly begun", lamenting it as having "no referent world, no identifiable background, for [its images and sounds] to symbolize or suggest." Richard Whittaker of The Austin Chronicle wrote that its 100-minute length "gives Ball more time to create subtle thematic vibrations, build up dreamlike symbolism and resonances through recurrent images ...  Yet it's also an eye-straining act of endurance ... The pat defense is that Skinamarink is not for conventional horror audiences, and that's obvious, but at the same time it feels overextended as a conceptual piece." Slant Magazine Chuck Bowen felt that the film's "spell is broken by its sheer, ungodly slowness, which springs from a paucity of ideas. There's simply not much going on here. And with one's mind permitted to roam for vast stretches, there's time to consider Ball's borrowings." Seeing the works of Robert Bresson as one such influence, Bowen wrote: "Ball's innovation is to present such enjoyable hokum with a kind of Bressonian anti-naturalism, turning the proceedings austere and humorless. ... What this monotonous formalist exercise doesn't have, though, is Bresson's sense of how minute details reveal unexpected dimensions of a person's soul."

Cath Clarke in The Guardian professed to "being underwowed" by the film, calling it "a little undeserving of its newly acquired cult status" and lacking "enough ideas to stretch beyond a 10-minute short. By the end I was more bored than frightened."

Audience response
Skinamarink received a polarized response from audiences; this, in combination with its viral spread on social media following its festival leak, drew comparisons to The Blair Witch Project (1999), another horror film that garnered word-of-mouth anticipation and split audience reactions.

References

External links
 Official website
 

2022 directorial debut films
2022 horror films
2022 independent films
2020s avant-garde and experimental films
2020s Canadian films
2020s English-language films
2020s supernatural horror films
Canadian avant-garde and experimental films
Canadian independent films
Canadian supernatural horror films
Crowdfunded films
English-language Canadian films
Films set in 1995
Films about families
Films about self-harm
Films about siblings
Films shot in Edmonton
Haunted house films
Obscenity controversies in film
Film controversies in Canada